Levine Joseph Toilolo (born July 30, 1991) is an American football tight end who is a free agent. He played college football at Stanford, and was drafted by the Atlanta Falcons in the fourth round of the 2013 NFL Draft.

Early years
Toilolo was born in San Diego, California.  While attending Helix High School in La Mesa, he played for the Helix Highlanders high school football team.

College career
Toilolo attended Stanford University, where he played for the Stanford Cardinal football team from 2009 to 2012. He finished his college career with 50 receptions for 763 yards and 10 touchdowns.  He decided to forgo his senior season and enter the 2013 NFL Draft.

Professional career
On January 8, 2013, it was announced that Toilolo would forgo his last year of collegiate eligibility and enter the 2013 NFL Draft. He was one of 19 collegiate tight ends to receive an invitation to the NFL Scouting Combine in Indianapolis, Indiana. Toilolo had a mediocre performance, had a few drops, and didn't display an ability to receive well. On March 21, 2013, he opted to attend Stanford's pro day, along with 12 other teammates. He performed the majority of drills, but was only able to have better measurements and times in the bench press (19 reps), vertical jump (33½"), and broad jump (9'9"). Toilolo attended only one private workout with the Atlanta Falcons and was the team he was linked to throughout the draft process. At the conclusion of the pre-draft process, Toilolo was projected to be a fifth round pick by NFL draft experts and scouts. He was ranked the eighth best tight end prospect in the draft by NFLDraftScout.com.

Atlanta Falcons
The Atlanta Falcons selected Toilolo in the fourth round with the 133rd overall pick in the 2013 NFL Draft. He was the second tight end selected from Stanford in 2013, behind former teammate Zach Ertz who was selected by the Philadelphia Eagles in the second round (35th overall).

2013
On May 21, 2013, the Falcons signed Toilolo to a four-year, $2.46 million contract that includes a signing bonus of $300,584.

Throughout training camp, Toilolo competed against Chase Coffman for the job as the backup tight end behind Tony Gonzalez. Head coach Mike Smith named Toilolo the third tight end on the depth chart behind Gonzalez and Coffman.

He made his professional regular season debut in the Atlanta Falcons' season-opening 23–17 loss at the New Orleans Saints. The following week, Toilolo made his first career reception on a four-yard pass from Matt Ryan and was tackled by Alec Ogletree in the fourth quarter of a 31–24 victory over the St. Louis Rams. On September 22, 2013, Toilolo made his first career start and scored the first touchdown of his career on a two-yard pass by Matt Ryan in the third quarter of a 27–23 loss to the Miami Dolphins. During a Week 8 matchup at the Arizona Cardinals, Toilolo made a season-high three receptions for six yards in a 27–13 loss.

2014

Toilolo was slated to become the starting tight end after the retirement of Tony Gonzalez and the departure of Chase Coffman in free agency. Throughout training camp, he competed with Mickey Shuler Jr. and Bear Pascoe for the starting tight end position. Head coach Mike Smith named Toilolo the starting tight end to start the regular season.

Toilolo started the Atlanta Falcons' season-opener against the New Orleans Saints and caught three passes for 19 yards and scored a one-yard touchdown during their 37–34 overtime victory. On October 12, 2014, he caught three passes for a season-high 34 receiving yards in a 27–13 loss to the Chicago Bears. In Week 16, Toilolo made a season-high four receptions for 17 yards as Atlanta defeated the New Orleans Saints 30–14. He finished the  season with 31 receptions for 238 yards and two touchdowns in 16 games and 16 starts. He also finished fourth in the NFL in dropped receptions with six. Head coach Mike Smith was fired after the Falcons finished 6–10 in 2014.

2015
Toilolo faced stiff competition for the starting tight end job after the Atlanta Falcons hired Dan Quinn as the new head coach. He was named the backup tight end to newly acquired free agent Jacob Tamme after beating out Tony Moeaki and Mickey Shuler Jr.

On October 15, 2015, Toilolo had a season-high two receptions for 18 yards during a 31–21 loss at the New Orleans Saints. Under offensive coordinator Kyle Shanahan, he was used primarily as a blocking tight end and saw a drastic drop in his reception total, finishing with only seven receptions for 44 receiving yards in 16 games and 15 starts.

2016
Toilolo entered training camp competing for the role as the backup tight end to Jacob Tamme against former Stanford teammate Austin Hooper, who was drafted by the Falcons in the third round of the 2016 NFL Draft. Head coach Dan Quinn named Toilolo the third string tight end to begin the regular season, behind Tamme and Hooper.

On October 16, 2016, Toilolo made three receptions for 69 yards and caught a 46-yard touchdown pass from Matt Ryan during a 26–24 loss at the Seattle Seahawks. He was inserted into the starting tight end position during Week 10 after Jacob Tamme suffered a shoulder injury that ended his season. In Week 9, he caught a 32-yard touchdown reception during a 43–28 victory over the Tampa Bay Buccaneers. He finished the season with 13 receptions for 234 yards and two touchdowns in 16 games and 11 starts.

The Atlanta Falcons finished first in the NFC South with an 11–5 record and received a playoff berth with a first round bye. On January 14, 2017, Toilolo started in his first career playoff game and caught two passes for 26-yard in a 36–20 victory over the Seattle Seahawks in the NFC Divisional Round. On February 5, 2017, he started in Super Bowl LI as the Falcons were defeated 34–28 by the New England Patriots in overtime.

2017
On March 9, 2017, the Falcons signed Toilolo to a three-year, $12 million contract extension with a signing bonus of $3 million.

Throughout training camp, Toilolo competed to retain his starting tight end position against  Austin Hooper and rookie Eric Saubert. Head coach Dan Quinn named him the second tight end behind Austin Hooper to begin the  regular season.

During a Week 3 matchup at the Detroit Lions, Toilolo made his first start of the season in Atlanta's 30–26 victory. The following week, Toilolo made a season-high three receptions for 21 yards during a 23–17 loss to the Buffalo Bills. On November 20, 2017, he caught two passes for 31 yards and scored on a 25-yard touchdown reception as the Falcons defeated the Seattle Seahawks 34–31.

On March 2, 2018, Toilolo was released by the Falcons.

Detroit Lions
On March 28, 2018, Toilolo signed with the Detroit Lions.

San Francisco 49ers
On May 15, 2019, Toilolo signed with the San Francisco 49ers.  Although Toilolo only caught two passes for the 49ers, he was regularly deployed as a blocking tight end. The 49ers reached Super Bowl LIV, but lost 31–20 to the Kansas City Chiefs.

New York Giants
On March 26, 2020, Toilolo signed a two-year contract with the New York Giants.

On August 4, 2021, Toilolo suffered a torn Achilles during practice and was ruled out for the season.

References

External links
 New York Giants bio
 Atlanta Falcons bio
 Stanford Cardinal bio

1991 births
Living people
American football tight ends
American sportspeople of Samoan descent
Atlanta Falcons players
Detroit Lions players
New York Giants players
People from La Mesa, California
Players of American football from San Diego
San Francisco 49ers players
Stanford Cardinal football players